Liu Xiangrong (born June 6, 1988, Nei Mongol) is a Chinese shot putter.  Her personal best is 19.24 m set in 2012.  She represented China at the 2012 Summer Olympics and the 2009, 2011 and 2013 World Championships.

She failed an out-of-competition drug test on 20 August 2017 and was banned from the sport for two years, lasting until 11 September 2019.

Achievements

See also
List of doping cases in athletics

References

1988 births
Living people
Athletes from Inner Mongolia
Chinese female shot putters
Olympic athletes of China
Athletes (track and field) at the 2012 Summer Olympics
Universiade medalists in athletics (track and field)
World Athletics Championships athletes for China
Doping cases in athletics
Chinese sportspeople in doping cases
Universiade silver medalists for China
Medalists at the 2013 Summer Universiade
21st-century Chinese women